Quirk or Quirks is having unconventional beliefs or manner, for example mispronouncing, in-jokes, clumsy and ditsy, and may refer to:
 The Quirk, a literary magazine
 "Quirks", a song by Ultravox! from the album Ha!-Ha!-Ha!
 18376 Quirk, an asteroid
 Quirk Books, a Pennsylvania-based publishing company
 Quirks mode, a web browser technique for maintaining backwards compatibility
 Quirks (board game)
 Quirks, the superpower system in the anime and manga My Hero Academia

People with the surname
 John Quirk (disambiguation)
 Billy Quirk (1873–1926), American silent film actor
 Mary Quirk (1880–1952), Australian politician
 Robert E. Quirk (1918–2009), American historian
 Randolph Quirk (1920–2017), British linguist and life peer
 Lawrence J. Quirk (1923–2014), American author, reporter, and film historian
 Ed Quirk (American football) (1925–1962), American football fullback in the National Football League
 John Shirley-Quirk (1931–2014), British bass-baritone singer
 Art Quirk (1938–2014), American Major League Baseball player
 Bryan Quirk (born 1946), Australian rules footballer
 Jamie Quirk (born 1954), American Major League Baseball player
 Margaret Quirk (born 1957), Minister for Corrective Services for the Australian Labor Party
 Wendy Quirk (born 1959), Canadian Olympic swimmer
 Les Quirk (born 1965), British Rugby League player
 Brian Quirk (born 1968), Democratic member of the Iowa House of Representatives
 Moira Quirk (born 1968), English actress, voice actress, comedian and referee of Nickelodeon GUTS
 Daniel Quirk (1982–2005), American professional wrestler
 Graham Quirk (b. 1958), Australian politician
 Jim Quirk (born 1940s), American football official in the National Football League
 Sharon Quirk-Silva (born 1962), American politician
David Quirk (born 1981), Australian comedian and actor

Other uses
 Cool (aesthetic)
 Eccentricity (behavior)
 Goofball comedy

See also
 Quirke (disambiguation), Irish surname
 Quirks & Quarks, a Canadian weekly science news program
 Quark (disambiguation)